Schoenotenes emmetra is a species of moth of the family Tortricidae first described by Józef Razowski in 2013. It is found on Seram Island in Indonesia.

The wingspan is about 19 mm. The ground colour of the forewings is white with brownish markings and darker veins. The hindwings are whitish, tinged with brownish terminally.

Etymology
The specific name refers to the systematic position of the species and is derived from Greek emmetros (meaning adequate).

References

Moths described in 2013
Schoenotenini